The Day of Action to Save Net Neutrality was an event on July 12, 2017, in which various organizations and individuals advocated for net neutrality in the United States. The event was a response to plans by Federal Communications Commission chairman Ajit Pai to end United States government policies which establish net neutrality. Over 50,000 websites, including many organizations, contributed activism after Fight for the Future, Demand Progress, and Free Press convened the event. The group called it "the largest online protest in history", a term which had previously referred to protests against Internet censorship in 2012.

Goals
The event sought to contact members of Congress and the FCC. The protest noted that Ajit V. Pai formerly worked at Verizon, a company which opposes net neutrality.

Participants

Amazon
American Civil Liberties Union
American Library Association
AT&T
Bittorrent Inc.
Center for Media Justice
Cracked.com
CREDO Mobile
Demand Progress
DeviantArt
Discord
Dreamhost
Etsy
Facebook
GitHub
Google
Greenpeace
Kickstarter
Kink.com
MoveOn.org
Mozilla Foundation
Netflix
Nextdoor
Organizing for Action
Pantheon Systems
Patreon
plug.dj
Pornhub
Private Internet Access
Reddit
RedTube
Shapeways
Spotify
Stack Exchange
Tumblr
Twitter
Vimeo
xHamster
Y Combinator
Zombo.com

Netflix CEO Reed Hastings publicly stated that net neutrality was no longer a primary concern for Netflix and that it would not participate. Netflix later reversed their position and decided to support the campaign. Prior to the Day of Action there was speculation Tumblr would not participate after Verizon acquired their parent company, Yahoo!. Tumblr would in fact be a noted participant, with their logo featured prominently on Battle for the Net's website along with other major supporters.

Reactions
Wired commented that the activism was a result of opposing sides of large organizations, with traditional telecom organizations as the target of protest and new media organizations as the protestors. Recode criticized companies such as Facebook and Google for holding back and posting messages that were unlikely to reach a large fraction of their users.

In response to the protest, some of the targeted ISPs stated that they supported the spirit of net neutrality but not the specific regulations passed in 2010 and 2015. Comcast called them "outdated" and Verizon called them "1930s style". Despite AT&T's opposition to net neutrality rules, a statement on the company webpage stated that it was "joining" the protest. AT&T's participation was rejected by the principal organizers of the event.

See also
 Internet activism
 Protests against SOPA and PIPA

References

Further reading
 This is the original press release announcing the event.

External links

2017 in American politics
Internet-based and online protests
Internet-related activism
July 2017 events in the United States
Net neutrality
Politics and technology